The Lamar Lady Cardinals basketball team represents Lamar University in NCAA Division I women's basketball competition. The team plays in the 10,080 seat Montagne Center.  After one season in the Western Athletic Conference, Lamar rejoined the Southland Conference on July 11, 2022.

History

Al Barbre years
In the 1991 NCAA Division I women's basketball tournament Lamar, under coach Al Barbre, made a run as a tenth seed in the Austin regional. The 1991 Lady Cardinals defeated Texas, LSU and Arkansas before being defeated by Virginia in the Elite Eight. Virginia went on to lose in the National championship game by 3 points.

Larry Tidwell years

Larry Tidwell coached the women's basketball team from 2007 through the end of the 2012-2013 season. Coach Tidwell turned the team around from a struggling program to a perennial power in the Southland Conference. In 2010 the team won the regular season and conference tournament to advance to the 2010 NCAA tournament. The Lady Cardinals made their first ever appearance in the preseason WNIT in the fall of 2010.  In the 2011 season, coach Tidwell's Lady Cardinals received their first top 100 RPI ranking (RPI #80) since the figures were made public in the 2005 season.
The 2010-2011 squad finished with a record of 25-8 and made an appearance in the 2011 post season WNIT.

Coach Tidwell resigned his position in March, 2013 to take a position at University of Texas-Pan American as head women's basketball coach.

Robin Harmony years

Robin Harmony was named head coach on April 30, 2013 and remained until April 2019.  Her first Lady Cardinal team shared the Southland Conference regular season title.  The Lady Cardinals also participated in their second WNIT and fourth post season tournament appearance in five seasons.  The Lady Cardinals competed in the WBI tournament in 2017.  The team won the Southland Conference 2017-18 regular season title outright repeating as outright champions in 2018-19.  The Lady Cardinals represented the Southland Conference in the Women's National Invitation Tournament for the third and the fourth time.

Coach Harmony resigned her position on April 19, 2019 to become head women's basketball coach for the College of Charleston.

Aqua Franklin years

Aqua Franklin was named head coach on May 1, 2019 becoming the 14th women's basketball head coach in program history.

Year-by-year results

Notes:
*1990-1991 wins vacated by the NCAA
*The Lady Cardinals competed in the AIAW through 1982.  From that point forward, they competed in NCAA Division I.

Source:

Yearly attendance
Below is the Lady Cardinals' home attendance since the 2004–05 season.

As of the 2022-23 season.

Record single game home attendance for a women's game (9,143) was set in a second-round game of the 1991 NCAA Division I women's basketball tournament played in the Montagne Center against the LSU Tigers on March 17, 1991.

Postseason
Sources:

NCAA Division I Tournament results
The Cardinals have appeared in two NCAA Division I Tournaments, all as Lamar University. Their combined record is 3–2.

WNIT results
The Cardinals have appeared in four Women's National Invitation Tournaments (WNIT). Their combined record is 0–4.

WBI results
The Cardinals have appeared in two Women's Basketball Invitational Tournaments (WBI). Their record is 1–2.

Awards and honors
Sources:

Western Athletic Conference

Freshman of the Year
 Akasha Davis, 2021

Southland Conference

Coach of the Year
 Robin Harmony, 2018

Player of the Year
Shawnta Vanzant, 2001
Jenna Plumley, 2010

Defensive Player of the Year
Chastadie Barrs, 2016, 2017, 2018

All Conference First Team
Kara Audery, 1983, 84
Joy Ommen, 1983
Talla Goudy, 1999
Shawnta Vanzant, 2001
LaToya Carson, 2006
Tamara Abalde, 2008
Jenna Plumley, 2010, 11
Kallis Lloyd, 2011, 12, 13
Gia Ayers, 2014
JaMeisha Edwards, 2015
Chastadie Barrs, 2018
Moe Kinard, 2018
Akasha Davis, 2022

Newcomer of the Year
Shawnta Vanzant, 2001
Darika Hill, 2009
Jenna Plumley, 2010
Monique Whitaker, 2011
Moe Kinard, 2017

Freshman of the Year
Brittney Williams, 2007
Tamara Abalde, 2008
Kiara Desamours, 2016
Jadyn Pimentel, 2018

All-Conference Defensive Team
Kallis Lloyd, 2013
Careen Baylor, 2013
Gia Ayers, 2014
JaMeisha Edwards, 2015
Chastadie Barrs, 2016, 2017, 2018
Kiandra Bowers, 2018

Southland Conference individual record holders
Most three-pointers made (season) - Jenna Plumley (100) - 2010
Most three-pointers made (career) - Jenna Plumley (205) - 2007-11
Most three-pointers attempted (season) - Jenna Plumley (298) - 2010
Most three-pointers attempted (career) - Jenna Plumley (869) - 2007-11
Highest three-point goal percentage (game) - Emily Spickler  (7-7) - 2009
Highest three-point goal percentage (season) - Emily Spickler (58-118) - 2009
Highest three-point goal percentage (career) - Emily Spickler (100-232) - 2007-09
Highest free throw percentage (career) - Jenna Plumley (234-278) - 2007-11
Most rebounds (game) - Anna Strickland (31) - 2016
Most steals (game) - Neno Anguiano (13) - 2000 (tied)
Most steals (season) - Chastadie Barrs (191) - 2018
Most steals (career) - Chastadies Barrs (451)

American South Conference

All-Conference First Team
Cassie Brooks, 1988, 1989
Uirannah Jackson, 1990
Brenda Hatchett, 1991
Barbara Hickey, 1991

Newcomer of the Year
Cassie Brooks, 1988
Uirannah Jackson, 1989

Coach of the Year
Al Barbre, 1988 (shared), 1989 (shared), 1991

Sun Belt Conference

All-Conference First Team
Brenda Hatchett, 1992
Barbara Hickey, 1992
Uirannah Jackson, 1992
Travesa Gant, 1994
Lisa McMahon, 1995
Lara Webb, 1996 (Unanimous)

All Tournament Team
Lara Webb, 1996

Freshman of the Year
Lisa McMahon, 1995
Jwanda Roberson, 1998

Coach of the Year
David McKey, 1995

References

External links